Solipur is a village and a Gram panchayat of Nalgonda mandal, Nalgonda district, in Telangana state.

References

Villages in Nalgonda district